The New Mexico State Library is a government library in Santa Fe.

History 
The library was established by an act of the New Mexico Legislature in 1961 from the library extension service that had previously been part of the Museum of New Mexico.

Collection and programs 
Notable parts of the collection are the Southwest Collection and publications from the state and federal government. In addition to lending and preserving materials, the state library also provides funds to public libraries throughout New Mexico and runs a rural bookmobile.

References

External links

Federal depository libraries
Libraries in New Mexico
New Mexico